
The Bishop of Southwell and Nottingham is the diocesan bishop of the Church of England Diocese of Southwell and Nottingham in the Province of York.

The diocese covers  including the whole of Nottinghamshire and a small area of South Yorkshire.  The see is in the town of Southwell where the seat is located at the Cathedral and Collegiate Church of the Blessed Virgin Mary (also known as Southwell Minster), which was elevated to cathedral status in 1884. The bishop's residence is Bishop's Manor, Southwell — in the minster precincts.

The diocese was created in 1884. Until 2005 it was known simply by the name "Southwell"; Nottingham was added to the title in that year. The current bishop is Paul Williams, whose election was confirmed on 11 May 2015. There are 314 church buildings in the Diocese.

The bishop is assisted by the suffragan Bishop of Sherwood, the current incumbent being Andy Emerton.

List of bishops

Assistant bishops
Among those called Assistant Bishop of Southwell:
19011913 (res.): Hamilton Baynes, Vicar of Nottingham, former Bishop of Natal and later Assistant Bishop and Provost of Birmingham
19341943 (d.): Neville Talbot, Vicar of St Mary's, Nottingham and former Bishop of Pretoria
19441945 (res.): Douglas Wilson, former Bishop of British Honduras; became Bishop of Trinidad
19461952: John Weller, Vicar of Edwalton (until 1949), Rector of Holme Pierrepont (from 1951) and former Bishop of the Falkland Islands and in Argentina and Eastern South America
November 19521968 (death): Morris Gelsthorpe, former Bishop in Sudan
1960–1971 (ret.): Mark Way, Rector of Averham, former Bishop of Masasi
1972–1977 (ret.): Bernard Markham, Rector of East Bridgford, former Bishop of Nassau

See also

Anglican Bishop of Nottingham

References

External links

 Crockford's Clerical Directory - Listings

Southwell

Bishops of Southwell and Nottingham
Diocese of Southwell and Nottingham